The Gorgon missile family was a series of experimental air-to-air, air-to-surface, and surface-to-surface missiles developed by the United States Navy's Naval Aircraft Modification Unit between 1943 and 1953. The immaturity of the technology involved meant that none of the Gorgon missiles achieved operational service, however they were extensively used in the development of guided missile controls and guidance technologies.

History
In the late 1930s, then-Commander Delmer S. Fahrney proposed that an "aerial torpedo" be developed for the purpose of intercepting bomber aircraft; while in 1940 the U.S. Navy Bureau of Aeronautics investigated the concept, it was only in May 1943, with the advent of practical jet and rocket engines, that the United States Navy initiated the Gorgon missile program, headquartered at the Naval Aircraft Modification Unit (later Naval Air Development Station) in Pennsylvania.

Several guidance options were considered, including television guidance using a camera in the missile's nose and steering commands sent via radio, active radar homing, or infrared homing. As 1943 progressed the Gorgon project diversified, and in October 1943 aerodynamic studies and delays in the development of suitable small turbojet engines led to the decision being made to trial two different designs: the Gorgon II, with a canard configuration, and the Gorgon III, configured as a small conventional aircraft. Each would be equipped with three different engine types; the 'A' model would be rocket-powered; 'B' powered by a turbojet engine, and 'C' would be equipped with a pulsejet engine. Neither Gorgon IIB or Gorgon IIIB would be built due to limitations of turbojet technology – although a target drone derived from Gorgon III was produced in small numbers – and Gorgon IIIC was changed to a twin-rocket configuration. In May 1945, the Gorgon IV, an air-to-surface missile powered by a ramjet engine, was added to the program.

Gorgon IIA was successfully flown in March 1945; it was stated to be the first jet- or rocket-powered radio-controlled aircraft to successfully fly in the United States. However limitations of the guidance system – project officer Molt Taylor expressed concerns about the capability of the human mind to process information quickly enough, given the speed at which the missiles flew, to react correctly to situations – and other technological issues meant that by late 1945, with the end of World War II, the production contracts for the air-launched Gorgon variants were changed to a pure technology-demonstration-and-development program; this was generally considered successful. The surface-launched Gorgon IIC had been planned for extensive use in Operation Downfall, the invasion of Japan; orders for a hundred missiles were placed with the Singer Manufacturing Company, however the end of the war following the atomic bombings of Hiroshima and Nagasaki resulted in the cancellation of the production contracts and Gorgon IIC also becoming a research-only project.

The final variant of the Gorgon family to be produced was the Pollux, a pulsejet test vehicle based on the Gorgon IIC, which was flown between 1949 and 1951. However, in 1950, the onset of the Cold War and the hot war in Korea led to the proposal to develop the Gorgon IV airframe into a chemical-weapons dispenser vehicle, designated Gorgon V; work on Gorgon V continued until late 1953, when the program was cancelled, the Gorgon program drawing to a close.

Variants

References

Citations

Bibliography

External links

  "Gorgon IV Sets Records For Ramjets" , February 1949, Popular Sciences
 U.S. Naval Aviation Chronology in World War II

Air-to-air missiles of the United States
Air-to-surface missiles of the United States
Unmanned military aircraft of the United States
World War II guided missiles of the United States